The Diocese of Saint Thomas of Mylapore, presently in Chennai, Tamil Nadu (or in Portuguese São Tomé de Meliapor, in Latin Sancti Thomae de Meliapor), was a Latin Church ecclesiastical territory or diocese of the Catholic Church in India. It was a suffragan diocese in the ecclesiastical province of the Archdiocese of Goa, under the Portuguese patronage. It was founded at 1606 and abandoned at 1952.
 
It was located in Mylapore, and derives its name from the site of its cathedral in which the Apostle St. Thomas was reportedly interred on the site of his martyrdom and the Tamil word Mailapur (i.e. the town of peacocks), which the Greeks rendered as Maliarpha, the Portuguese as Meliapor, and the English as Mylapore.

Episcopal ordinaries

Sebastião de São Pedro, Augustinian Order (O.E.S.A.) (9 Jan 1606 – 16 Feb 1615), next bishop of Cochin 
Luís de Brito de Menezes, O.E.S.A. (18 May 1615 – 27 May 1627), next Bishop of Cochin
Luís Paulo de Estrela, Franciscan Third Order (T.O.R.) (10 Feb 1631 – 9 Jan 1637 Died)
Gaspar Alphonsus Álvares, Jesuits (S.J.) (19 Dec 1691 – 24 Nov 1708 Died)
Francisco Laynez, S.J. (24 Nov 1708 – 11 June 1715 Died)
Manuel Sanches Golão (8 June 1718 – ?? )
 José Pinheiro, S.J. (21 Feb 1725 – 15 March 1744 Died)
António da Encarnação, O.E.S.A. (8 March 1745 – 22 Sep 1752 Died)
Bernardo de São Caetano, O.E.S.A. (28 May 1759 – 4 Nov 1780 Died)
Joaquim de Meneses e Ataíde, O.E.S.A. (29 Oct 1804 Confirmed – 29 May 1820), next bishop of Elvas
Estevão de Jesus Maria da Costa, Friars Minor (O.F.M.) (3 July 1826 – 28 Jan 1828), next Bishop of Angra
António Tristão Vaz Teixeira (1836 – 1852)
Henrique José Reed da Silva (14 March 1887 – 12 August 1897 Resigned)
António José de Sousa Barroso (11 Oct 1897 – 23 May 1899), next bishop of Porto
Teotónio Emanuel Ribeiro Vieira de Castro (22 June 1899 – 25 May 1929), next Archbishop of Goa e Damão
António Maria Teixeira (25 May 1929 – 15 March 1933 Died)
Carlos de Sá Fragoso (4 Dec 1933 – 10 April 1937 Resigned)
Manuel de Medeiros Guerreiro (10 April 1937 – 2 March 1951), next Bishop of Nampula.
Extinction – 1952

See also 
 List of Catholic dioceses in India
 Catholic Church in India
 São Tomé de Meliapore, and overlapping territory that existed from 1523 to 1749

References

External links 
 GCatholic

Former Roman Catholic dioceses in Asia
Roman Catholic dioceses in India
Suppressed Roman Catholic dioceses
1606 establishments in India
Christianity in Tamil Nadu